SS Sizergh Castle was a British Cargo ship that sprang a leak and foundered in the North Atlantic, while she was travelling from Galveston, Texas, United States to Antwerp, Belgium with a cargo of wheat.

Construction 
Sizergh Castle was constructed at the William Pickersgill & Sons Ltd. shipyard in Sunderland, England. She was completed in 1903.

She had a Triple expansion steam engine driving a single screw propeller. The engine was rated at 349 nhp.

Sinking 
On 7 October 1919, Sizergh Castle was on a voyage from Galveston, Texas, United States, to Antwerp, Belgium, with a cargo of wheat when she sprang a leak and foundered in the North Atlantic. There were no casualties.

References

Cargo ships of the United Kingdom
Steamships of the United Kingdom
Shipwrecks in the Atlantic Ocean
1903 ships
Ships sunk with no fatalities
Maritime incidents in 1919